Hanara Tangiawha Te Ohaki "Arnold" Reedy  (16 August 1903 – 8 April 1971) was a New Zealand tribal leader, farmer and soldier. Of Māori descent, he identified with the Ngāti Porou iwi. He was born in Whareponga, East Coast, New Zealand, on 16 August 1903. He was the eldest son of Materoa Reedy, née Ngarimu, and John Marshall Reedy, himself the eldest son of Thomas Tyne Reedy, an Irishman, and Mihi Takawhenua Ngawiki Tuhou. Hekia Parata is his granddaughter. He was appointed an Officer of the Order of the British Empire, for services to the Māori people, in the 1970 Queen's Birthday Honours.

He was educated at Napier Boys' High School and Gisborne Boys' High School. He was a captain in the Māori Battalion in World War II, serving alongside his cousin Moana-Nui-a-Kiwa Ngarimu, and returned to farming after the war. He was a foundation member of the New Zealand Maori Council for ten years, and was chairman of the Horouta Tribal Executive between 1956 and 1970. In 1949 he was a Māori member of the New Zealand delegation to the United Nations.

References

1903 births
1971 deaths
New Zealand military personnel of World War II
Ngāti Porou people
New Zealand Māori soldiers
People educated at Napier Boys' High School
People educated at Gisborne Boys' High School
Unsuccessful candidates in the 1957 New Zealand general election
Unsuccessful candidates in the 1960 New Zealand general election
Unsuccessful candidates in the 1963 New Zealand general election
Unsuccessful candidates in the 1966 New Zealand general election
Māori politicians
New Zealand National Party politicians
Social Credit Party (New Zealand) politicians
New Zealand Officers of the Order of the British Empire